The 2014 Syrian Premier League season is the 43rd since its establishment.
This seasons league featured two stages. Stage one pitted two groups of nine teams and kicked off on 2 February 2014. The top three of each group advanced to the Championship Playoff to determine the overall league champions. The bottom two of each group relegated to the second division.

All matches were played in Damascus and Latakia due to security concerns.

Teams

Stadiums and locations

First stage

Each team plays each other once, top three advanced to the championship playoff, bottom two relegate.

Group A

Group B

Championship playoff

Each team plays each other once, the first place teams is the first stage get three points plus, the second place get two points and the third place get one point.

As a result, the teams started with the following points before the playoff: Al Wahda 3 points, Musfat Baniyas 3, Al Jaish 2, Al Shorta 2, Al Muhafaza 1 and Al Wathba 1

Championship Match
Al-Wahda, wins Syrian Premier League Championship 2013–2014.

References

Syrian Premier League seasons
1
Syria
1
Syria